"Sometimes When We Touch" is a 1977 ballad by Canadian pop rock artist Dan Hill, from his album Longer Fuse. It was written by Hill and Barry Mann; Hill wrote the lyrics, while Mann wrote the music.

The song was Hill's biggest hit, peaking at #3 on the United States Billboard Hot 100 and #10 on the Adult Contemporary chart. It has since been covered by a variety of other artists.

Composition
"Sometimes When We Touch" began as a song Hill wrote in 1973, at age 19, in an attempt to convince the woman he was dating to be his exclusive girlfriend; at the time, she was dating two other men. The lyrics were based on the relationship between Hill and the woman, and Hill's ambivalence at not being able to express his true feelings for her. After completing it, Hill sang the song for the woman, but his attempt was unsuccessful, as she had just recently decided to move to the United States with another one of the men she had been dating, an American football player who had just been dropped from the Canadian football team the Toronto Argonauts.

By 1976, Hill had released two albums, but had not yet broken into the American market. Hill was in Los Angeles, meeting with the Sam Trust, the president of his publishing company, ATV Music, when Trust told Hill that he felt that Hill's problem was that his melodies were not catchy enough, and suggested that he collaborate with American songwriter Barry Mann. Hill met with Mann, and gave Mann the lyrics to his song, which he had never released. Hill told Mann that it was simply a poem he had written, not wanting Mann to feel insulted that he was receiving a rejected song. Within a day, Mann had written a new melody for the song, which required Hill to write several new lines, as Mann had restructured the lyrics somewhat.

Production
"Sometimes When We Touch" was first recorded in 1977. Musicians included Bobby Ogdin (piano), Larrie Londin (drums), Bob Mann (guitar), Don Potter (guitar), Tom Szczesniak (bass). The record was produced by Fred Mollin and Matthew McCauley, recorded at Manta Sound, Toronto.

Charts

Weekly charts

Year-end charts

Mark Gray and Tammy Wynette version

"Sometimes When We Touch" was notably covered in 1985 as a duet by American country music artists Mark Gray and Tammy Wynette.

The song was recorded in November 1984 and was produced by Steve Buckingham. It was released as a single in January 1985 via Columbia Records. The B-side of the record was a solo recording by Gray entitled "You're Gonna Be the Last Love". The single reached number 6 on the Billboard Hot Country Singles chart and number 25 on the Canadian Country chart. The song became Wynette's first top ten hit since 1982's "Another Chance" and Gray's fourth top ten hit as a solo artist.

The song was issued on both Gray and Wynette's solo studio albums. "Sometimes When We Touch" first appeared on Gray's album This 'Ol Piano in 1984. It was the only duet recording featured on the album and was his second studio album release. It was then issued on Tammy Wynette's 1985 studio album, also called Sometimes When We Touch. The track was also the only duet recording on Wynette's studio release.

Track listings
7" vinyl single
 "Sometimes When We Touch"  – 3:37
 "You're Gonna Be the Last Love"  – 2:37

Charts

Other versions
Tina Turner recorded a version for her 1978 album Rough. An Estonian language version of the song (entitled "Puudutus" ("Touch")) also exists. Often performed as a duet, the song has been covered by Koit Toome and Maarja-Liis Ilus among others. The song was included on Toome's acoustic greatest hits album Allikas, with the writing credited to "H. Dan".

Irish pop group Fifth Avenue also covered this song on their only album. This rendition contains a key change.

UK dance singer Newton also took the song into the top 40 in the UK (peaking at #32 in February 1996) and to #5 in Australia, also in 1996. Newton's version went Gold in Australia.

The ska band Five Iron Frenzy did a cover of this song as part of a "Medley" during their farewell tour in 2004. There is also a version recorded in 1980 by Cleo Laine and James Galway. British singer Rod Stewart recorded the song for his 1996 album If We Fall in Love Tonight. Veteran British entertainer Tommy Steele recorded it on his Family Album.

Manny Pacquiao sang the song on the November 3, 2009 episode of Jimmy Kimmel Live!. This was Pacquiao's first guest appearance on an American late night TV talk show and his first singing performance on American TV. He would later record this song in April 2011 as a single which reached number 19 on the Billboard Adult Contemporary chart.

"När vi rör varann"
There is a Swedish version of the lyrics, called "När vi rör varann" ("When We Touch Each Other"), written by Ingela "Pling" Forsman and recorded by Kikki Danielsson in 1980 and Susanne Alfvengren in 1984. "När vi rör varann" has become the signature song for Susanne Alfvengren. The Monica Silverstrand version reached the Svensktoppen from 24 February-2 March 1980, peaking at number 6.

Swedish opera singer Loa Falkman covered this song on his 1990 album Symfonin.

Cultural influence
The song has been used in numerous films, television programs and commercials since its initial release. Among the more notable usages are the 1999 film Superstar, a 2003 GEICO commercial, the 2008 film Tropic Thunder (it is agent Rick Peck's ringtone), and the 2014 The Simpsons episode "The Yellow Badge of Cowardge".

In 1996, This Hour Has 22 Minutes ran a comedic sketch in which Canada was taken over by terrorists who in turn were promptly defeated when the Canadian Armed Forces deployed the song as their secret weapon.  At the time, Hill was making television appearances to promote his new album I'm Doing Fine, and Pamela Wallin confronted Hill (who had not yet seen it) with the sketch on live national television.

References

1970s ballads
1977 songs
1978 singles
1985 singles
20th Century Fox Records singles
Dan Hill songs
Songs written by Dan Hill
Songs written by Barry Mann
Mark Gray (singer) songs
RPM Top Singles number-one singles
Number-one singles in South Africa
Tammy Wynette songs
Male–female vocal duets
Epic Records singles
Susanne Alfvengren songs
Manny Pacquiao songs
Rock ballads